Miedna  is a village in the administrative district of Gmina Sępopol, within Bartoszyce County, Warmian-Masurian Voivodeship, in Northern Poland, close to the border with the Kaliningrad Oblast of Russia.

Prior to the year 1945, the area was part of Germany (East Prussia).

The village has a population of 80 people.

References

Miedna